In law, to compass is to purpose (or intend) something. It is an individual that is imagining something or to plot a plan. Compassing signifies a purpose (or design) of the mind (or will), and not carrying such design to effect.

References

A Law Dictionary, Adapted to the Constitution and Laws of the United States. By John Bouvier. Published 1856.

Legal terminology